NGC 3867 is a spiral galaxy located about 350 million light-years away in the constellation Leo. It was discovered by astronomer Édouard Stephan on March 23, 1884 and is a member of the Leo Cluster.

See also
 List of NGC objects (3001–4000)

References

External links

3867
36649
Leo (constellation)
Leo Cluster
Astronomical objects discovered in 1884
Spiral galaxies
6731